Partlow may refer to:

People
Brian Partlow, American arena football coach
Hope Partlow (born 1988), American singer
Lou Partlow (1892–1981), American football player
Roy Partlow (1911–1987), American baseball player
Vern Partlow (1910–1987), American journalist and folk singer
Corydon Partlow Brown (1848-1891), Canadian politician

Fictional characters
Chris Partlow, a character in the television series The Wire

Places
Partlow, Virginia, an unincorporated community
Partlow Mountain, New York

See also